Below are the squads for the Football at the 1973 All-Africa Games, hosted by Lagos, Nigeria, and which took place between 8 and 16 January 1973.

Group 1

Algeria
Head coach: Mohamed El Kenz and Abdelhamid Sellal

Ghana

Nigeria

Tanzania

Group 2

Congo

Egypt
Head coach:

Guinea

Upper Volta

External links
Football II All Africa Games - Lagos 1973 - todor66.com

African Games football squads
1973 All-Africa Games